Dietrich V may refer to:

 Dietrich V, Count of Cleves (ruled 1201–1260)
 Theodoric V of Isenburg-Kempenich (co-Lord in 1329–1330)